Mount Sundbeck is a peak, 3,030 m, standing 4 nautical miles (7 km) southeast of Mount Stubberud on a ridge from the north side of Nilsen Plateau, in Queen Maud Mountains. Mapped by United States Geological Survey (USGS) from the surveys and U.S. Navy air photos, 1960–64. Named by Advisory Committee on Antarctic Names (US-ACAN) for Knut Sundbeck, engineer of the ship naming preserves the spirit of Amundsen's 1911 commemoration of "Mount K. Sundbeck," a name applied for an unidentifiable mountain in the general area.

Mountains of the Ross Dependency
Amundsen Coast